Wonji Sugar is an Ethiopian football club based in Oromia.  They are a member of the Ethiopian Football Federation national (second) league.  Their home stadium is Wonji Stadium.

Current squad

External links 
 Neil Morris, "Visit to Wonji"

Football clubs in Ethiopia
Sport in Oromia Region